Motlohi Maliehe (born on September 28 1958) is the current Minister of Public Service in Lesotho. Prior to this, he was the Minister of Forestry and Reclamation from May 2020 to February 2021.

Background and education 
Maliehe was born on September 28, 1958 in Molumong, Mokhotolong district. He has interests in reading novels. Motlohi Maliehe got his First School Leaving Certificate from Maluba-lube Primary School and his Secondary School Certificate at St. James High School. Thereafter, Maliehe took some certification courses in Time Management, Conflict Management and Mining Economics. Maliehe belongs to ABC political party in Lesotho.

References 

Living people
1958 births
Government ministers of Lesotho
People from Mokhotlong District
Members of the National Assembly (Lesotho)